Breg ob Kokri is a village on the right bank of the Kokra River in the Municipality of Preddvor in the Upper Carniola region of Slovenia.

Name
Breg ob Kokri was attested in historical sources as Rain and Rein between 1147 and 1154, and as Rayn in 1344. The name of the settlement was changed from Breg to Breg ob Kokri in 1955. In the past the German name was Ranndorf.

Church
The village church is dedicated to Saint Leonard. Although it has a Baroque belfry, it has one of the best preserved medieval interiors in Slovenia. At the end of the nave a painted archway leading into the sanctuary has two layers of frescos with depictions of Saint George and the Dragon, Saint Leonard, and Saint Nicholas. The frescos date to the mid-15th century. The unique wooden ceiling is painted with 30 individual scenes and dates to circa 1480. The vault above the altar is also painted. The original stained glass was stolen, but copies of the original have been installed in its place. The gilded altars are from the late 17th century.

References

External links
Breg ob Kokri at Geopedia

Populated places in the Municipality of Preddvor